Indoor volleyball was contested at the 2006 Asian Games in Doha, Qatar. All matches played at the Al-Rayyan Indoor Hall.

Schedule

Medalists

Medal table

Draw
The draw ceremony for the team sports was held on 7 September 2006 at Doha.

Men
Due to scheduling conflicts with 2006 FIVB Volleyball Men's World Championship, China, Iran, Japan, Kazakhstan and South Korea alongside the host team Qatar qualified directly to the quarterfinal stage. The remaining teams were seeded based on their final ranking at the 2005 Asian Men's Volleyball Championship. India and Thailand, the next top two teams started the competition from the preliminary round.

Qualification – Pool A
  (10)
 
 

Qualification – Pool B
  (11)*
 
 

Qualification – Pool C
  (13)
 
 

Qualification – Pool D
  (17)
  (18)
 
 *

* Withdrew.

Preliminary – Pool A
  (4)
 2nd Qualification – Pool A
 1st Qualification – Pool B
 2nd Qualification – Pool C
 1st Qualification – Pool D

Preliminary – Pool B
  (5)
 1st Qualification – Pool A
 2nd Qualification – Pool B
 1st Qualification – Pool C
 2nd Qualification – Pool D

Quarterfinals
  (Host) vs. 1st Preliminary – Pool B
 Asia Rank 1 vs. 1st Preliminary – Pool A
 Asia Rank 2 vs. Asia Rank 5
 Asia Rank 3 vs. Asia Rank 4

The teams were seeded based on their performance at the 2006 FIVB Volleyball Men's World Championship.

Women
The teams were seeded based on their final ranking at the 2005 Asian Women's Volleyball Championship.

Pool A
  (1)
  (4)
  (5)
 

Pool B
  (2)
  (3)
  (6)

Final standing

Men

Women

References

 Men's results
 Women's results

External links
 Official website – Volleyball
 Official website – Beach volleyball

 
2006 Asian Games events
Asian Games
2006
2006 Asian Games